Espeletia, commonly known as 'frailejones' ("big monks"), is a genus of perennial subshrubs, in the family Asteraceae. The genus, which is native mainly to Colombia, Venezuela and Ecuador, was first formally described in 1808. The genus was named after the viceroy of New Granada, José Manuel de Ezpeleta.

The plants live at high altitude in páramo ecosystems. The trunk is thick, with succulent hairy leaves disposed in a dense spiral pattern. Marcescent leaves help protect the plants from cold. The flowers are usually yellow, similar to daisies. Some members of the genus exhibit a caulirosulate growth habit.

The frailejón plant is endangered due to destruction of the páramo for agricultural purposes, especially potato crops. This activity continues, despite the Colombian government declaring it illegal. Since about 2010 the plants have also come under attack by beetle larvae, a moth and a fungus, some new to science but suspected to be related to climate change which allows lower-altitude species to flourish.

Espeletia is well known for contributing to the world in water sustainability by capturing water vapor from passing clouds in its spongy trunk and releasing it through the roots into the soil, thus helping to create vast high-altitude subterranean water deposits and lakes that will eventually form rivers.

Species
Species accepted by the Plants of the World Online as of December 2022:[1]

References

Further reading
Padilla-González, G.F., Diazgranados, M., Da Costa, F.B.(2017) Biogeography shaped the metabolome of the genus Espeletia: a phytochemical perspective on an Andean adaptive radiation. Scientific Reports:  volume 7, Article number: 8835. pdf

External links

Asteraceae genera
Millerieae
Flora of South America
Páramo flora
Taxa named by Aimé Bonpland
Taxa named by Alexander von Humboldt